Aurora College, formerly Arctic College, is a college located in the Northwest Territories, Canada with campuses in Inuvik, Fort Smith and Yellowknife. They have learning centres in 23 communities in the NWT. The head office for Aurora College is located in Fort Smith.

Aurora College is the only post-secondary institution within the Northwest Territories.

Programs

Aurora College delivers programs at three campuses, 21 community learning centres and other community sites in the Northwest Territories. Aurora College delivers community-centred post-secondary programs that accurately reflect northern culture and the needs of the northern labour market. Aurora offers several certificate and diploma programs as well as the Bachelor of Education degree program and the Bachelor of Science in nursing program.

Athletics
Aurora College provides intramural sports, such as basketball, volleyball, soccer, badminton and hockey and recreational programs. Before the new Aurora Campus was built the old gymnasium (now torn down) in Inuvik was the largest in the Northwest Territories.

Residence
Aurora College provides a limited supply of accommodation for single students and for those with families.

Aurora College Community Learning Centres
The Aurora College has community learning centres in several communities, which deliver academic upgrading and community-based courses and programs, depending on demand and funding. Community learning centres are located in Aklavik, Deline, Fort Good Hope, Fort McPherson, Ulukhaktok, Norman Wells,  Tulita, Tuktoyaktuk, Tsiigehtchic, Fort Providence, Fort Resolution, Fort Simpson, Hay River, Lutselk'e, Fort Liard and Hay River Reserve, Behchoko, Whatì, Gamèti, Wekweeti, and Dettah/N'Dilo.

Partnerships

Aurora programs prepare students for further education through university partners.

Scholarships and bursaries
The Government of Canada sponsors an Aboriginal Bursaries Search Tool that lists over 680 scholarships, bursaries, and other incentives offered by governments, universities, and industry to support Aboriginal post-secondary participation. Aurora College scholarships for First Nations, Inuit and Métis students include: Gail Marie Jones Scholarship; ATCO Continuous Academic Effort Scholarships; Enbridge Pipelines (NW) Inc. Bursaries; Town of Inuvik Scholarship; Diavik Diamond Mines Inc. Trades and Technology Bursaries; ATCO Developmental Studies Scholarships; ConocoPhillips Scholarship; Aurora Research Institute Awards and Fellowships.

History
In the 1970s, the Adult Vocational Training Centre (AVTC) was established. In 1981, the Adult Vocational Training Centre (AVTC) was declared a college and renamed Thebacha College.  In 1984, Arctic College was established with campuses in Fort Smith and Iqaluit. The college grew to include campuses in each region of the Northwest Territories. The mandate was to deliver adult and post-secondary education.

In preparation for Nunavut's establishment as an independent territory,  Arctic College was divided on January 1, 1995. Nunavut Arctic College was established to assume responsibility for Arctic College's operations in Nunavut with remaining Arctic College facilities in the western Arctic renamed to Aurora College. The Science Institute of the Northwest Territories was amalgamated with Aurora College in January 1995 and was renamed the Aurora Research Institute.

See also
Higher education in the Northwest Territories
Higher education in Nunavut
List of colleges in Canada

References

All facts, unless otherwise stated, are from Aurora College's web site.

External links 
 

Universities and colleges in the territories of Canada
Education in the Northwest Territories
Educational institutions established in 1981
1981 establishments in Canada